Wei Shuo (272–349), courtesy name Mouyi (茂猗), sobriquet He'nan (和南), commonly addressed just as Lady Wei (衛夫人), was a Chinese calligrapher of Eastern Jin, who established consequential rules about the regular script. Her famous disciple was Wang Xizhi.

Biography
Born in modern Xia, Shanxi, Wei was the daughter of Wei Zhan (衛展) or the daughter or younger sister of Wei Heng (衛恆). Wei was married to Li Ju (李矩, not to be confused with the Jin general of the same name, Li Ju), the Governor of Ding Prefecture. Wei and Li had Li Chong (李充), also a calligrapher and a Palace Secretarial Attendant (中書侍郎). She was taught the style that Zhong Yao taught, however, Wei's style is narrower than Zhong's wider style. Wei's The Picture of Ink Brush (筆陣圖) describes the Seven Powers (七勢) that later became the famous Eight Principles of Yong.

Works
Wei's other works include:
 Famous Concubine Inscription (名姬帖, Ming Ji Tie)
 The Inscription of Weishi He'nan (衛氏和南帖, Weishi He'nan Tie)

References

 Wang, Yuchi, "Wei Shuo". Encyclopedia of China (Arts Edition), 1st ed.

272 births
349 deaths
4th-century Chinese calligraphers
Jin dynasty (266–420) calligraphers
Women calligraphers
4th-century Chinese women
4th-century Chinese people
3rd-century Chinese women
3rd-century Chinese people